Jaha is a surname. Notable people with the surname include:

Cyril VIII Jaha (1840–1916), Syrian clergyman
John Jaha (born 1966), American baseball player
Sali Jaha (1803–1883), Albanian military and freedom fighter